Roswitha Beier (born 22 December 1956 in Riesa) is a German former swimmer who competed in the 1972 Summer Olympics.

References

1956 births
Living people
People from Riesa
German female swimmers
Female butterfly swimmers
Olympic swimmers of East Germany
Swimmers at the 1972 Summer Olympics
Olympic silver medalists for East Germany
Medalists at the 1972 Summer Olympics
World Aquatics Championships medalists in swimming
Olympic silver medalists in swimming
Sportspeople from Saxony